Alexandra Bozovic and Talia Gibson won the title after defeating Han Na-lae and Priska Madelyn Nugroho 7–5, 6–4 in the final.

Asia Muhammad and Storm Sanders were the defending champions but both players chose not to participate.

Seeds

Draw

Draw

References

External Links
Main Draw

City of Playford Tennis International - Doubles